St. Edmond's Academy is an independent Catholic primary school for boys founded by the Congregation of Holy Cross in Wilmington, Delaware, United States in 1959.  The school's patron saint is Saint André of Montreal.

History

Saint Edmond's Academy was founded to meet the academic needs of Catholic Boys in Wilmington.  Ursuline Academy provided 1-5 education for both boys and girls, but became exclusively a girls' school beginning in grade 6, leaving boys without a comparable option.  Wilmington's Bishop Edmond John FitzMaurice offered his residence for the original school.  The name "St. Edmond's" was chosen in honor of the Bishop.

The School soon outgrew this space located in downtown Wilmington at 1301 Delaware Ave.  In 1963, it moved to its current location north of the city at 2120 Veale Rd.

The school recently completed a major $12 million expansion in 2006, significantly increasing the size of the school buildings.  Beginning with the 2006–07 school year, it expanded from serving grades 4–8 to its current Junior Kindergarten - 8th grade classes.  The current enrollment is 242 students.

Facilities

The Saint Edmond's Academy campus includes  of land.  It has 30 classrooms, a state-of-the-art science lab, a field house, an art room, chapel, two libraries, a model train room, choral room, band room, cafeteria, two gymnasiums, extended day care facilities, a 450-seat auditorium, a baseball field, soccer field, and a 400-meter all-weather track.

Notable alumni

Lieutenant Colonel Marty Devine (1970) US Army, Iraq War Veteran
Darryl Parson (1979) Deputy Attorney General, Delaware Dept. of Justice
Michel Troy (1981) Assoc. General Counsel Center for Individual Rights
Kester Irwin Hanley Crosse II (1984) - Gastroenterologist Columbia, MD
Michael Medico (1986) - Actor/Director/Producer

External links
 Dialogue Article on expansion
 School web site

Educational institutions established in 1959
Private elementary schools in Delaware
Private middle schools in Delaware
Schools in New Castle County, Delaware
Buildings and structures in Wilmington, Delaware
Roman Catholic Diocese of Wilmington
Boys' schools in Delaware
1959 establishments in Delaware